4Y or 4-Y may refer to:

4 years
4Y, IATA code for Eurowings Discover and Airbus Transport International (controlled duplicate)
4Y, a series of models of Toyota Y engine
4Y, the production code for the 1978 Doctor Who serial Underworld

See also
Y4 (disambiguation)